George Elmer Fisher (January 17, 1869 – June 11, 1958) was an American college football coach and college professor. He served as the head football coach at Susquehanna University, his alma mater, in 1896. Fisher was a professor at Susquehanna for 50 years and is credited with starting the school's intercollegiate athletic program.

References

External links
 

1869 births
1958 deaths
19th-century American educators
20th-century American educators
Susquehanna River Hawks football coaches
Susquehanna University faculty
Bucknell University alumni
Illinois Wesleyan University alumni
Susquehanna University alumni
People from Snyder County, Pennsylvania
Coaches of American football from Pennsylvania
Educators from Pennsylvania